"My Turn" is the first single from Hoobastank's album For(N)ever, released on January 27, 2009. It can be heard on the band's official website. It is the only music video to feature bassist David Azmueca prior to his departure in early 2009.

Music video
Doug Robb stated in the blog on Myspace that the official music video for "My Turn" has been completed. 
We recently shot the video for the song My Turn with director Paul Brown. Unlike any video we had shot before, and this will be our 12th video, this one is specifically designed to be viewed online instead of only on TV... We then got dressed up in costumes. Football players, cheerleaders, classic "Hoobustank" basketball uniforms, not so "super" heroes, women's clothing, moto gear, wetsuits, whatever we could find. We wore it all and performed in it all....So you might be wondering why we'd have so many people performing the same song. I can sum it up in one word, OPTIONS. When the video goes online you'll have the option to create any version of the video

Best,

Doug Robb

Charts

Use in media

The song was featured as the theme song for the TNA Destination X 2009 PPV. It was also played during ESPN coverage of the 2009 NFL Draft. In 2017, it was featured in the video game Dirt 4.

References

External links
 "My Turn" online music video

2008 singles
Hoobastank songs
2008 songs
Island Records singles
Songs written by Dan Estrin
Songs written by Doug Robb
Songs written by Chris Hesse